Guillermo Eduardo Díaz Zambrano (29 December 1930 – 25 September 1997) was a Chilean footballer who played as a left winger. He played for Chile in the 1950 FIFA World Cup. He also played for Santiago Wanderers.

Record at FIFA Tournaments

References

External links
FIFA profile

Guillermo Díaz at MemoriaWanderers.cl 
Guillermo Díaz at PartidosdeLaRoja.cl 

1930 births
1997 deaths
Sportspeople from Valparaíso
Chilean footballers
Chilean expatriate footballers
Chile international footballers
1950 FIFA World Cup players
Chilean Primera División players
Santiago Wanderers footballers
Club Deportivo Palestino footballers
La Liga players
Real Zaragoza players
Canadian National Soccer League players
Chilean expatriate sportspeople in Spain
Chilean expatriate sportspeople in Canada
Expatriate footballers in Spain
Expatriate soccer players in Canada
Association football forwards
Chilean football managers
Primera B de Chile managers
Chilean Primera División managers
Santiago Wanderers managers
Unión San Felipe managers
Cobresal managers
Provincial Osorno managers